Gerardo Díaz y su Gerarquía is a Regional Mexican band from La Calera, municipality of Zirándaro, Guerrero, Mexico that was founded in 2018. It was formed by Gerardo Díaz. 

The band continues in its work of bringing the music of Tierra Caliente to Mexico, the United States and Central America. Alongside colleagues such as La Dinastía de Tuzantla and Beto y sus Canarios, they are musical acts in exploiting Tierra Caliente music.

Mi Última Caravana, El Mejor Lugar and El Albañil are some of the band's hits, composded by Gerardo Díaz, nicknamed El Cerebro de Oro, with millions of streams.

Discography

Albums
 2018: Pa' los Mal Agradecidos
 2018: Composiciones y No Imitaciones
 2019: Amistad y Pesos
 2021: Yo Soy de la Sierra

Extended play
 2019: 5 Covers

Awards

References

External links
Facebook
Instagram

Musical groups from Guerrero
Tierra Caliente music groups